Asteria Limai (born 19 July 2001) is a Belarusian athlete. She competed in the women's 4 × 400 metres relay event at the 2020 Summer Olympics.

References

External links
 

2001 births
Living people
Belarusian female sprinters
Athletes (track and field) at the 2020 Summer Olympics
Olympic athletes of Belarus
Place of birth missing (living people)